Jelan Kendrick (born October 9, 1992) is an American basketball player for the Pioneros de Los Mochis of the Circuito de Baloncesto de la Costa del Pacífico (CIBACOPA). He was a McDonald's All-American for Joseph Wheeler High School in Atlanta, Georgia. Kendrick was a member of the UNLV Runnin Rebels in college after committing to Memphis and getting kicked out.

High school
Named to the 2010 McDonald's All-American Boys Game.
Also named to the 2010 Jordan Brand Classic.
Ranked as the nation's second-best small forward and 13th-best overall player by ESPN.com.
Considered a five-star recruit by Rivals.com.
Ranked as the eighth best player in the country by Rivals.com.
Leading scorer at Indian Hills CC

|-
|}

UNLV
Season Stats

Professional career 
On August 8, 2018, Kendrick signed with the London Lightning of the National Basketball League of Canada.

References

External links
Rivals.com Profile
Espn.com Proflile

1992 births
Living people
Basketball players from Georgia (U.S. state)
Indian Hills Warriors basketball players
McDonald's High School All-Americans
Ole Miss Rebels men's basketball players
Parade High School All-Americans (boys' basketball)
Shooting guards
UNLV Runnin' Rebels basketball players
American men's basketball players
London Lightning players
Fraser Valley Bandits players
Pioneros de Los Mochis players